Mahamet Diagouraga (born 8 January 1984 in Corbeil-Essonnes, Essonne) is a French-born Malian footballer who last played for Modena.

Biography
Diagouraga was signed form Bologna in summer 2002. He was farmed to Serie C1 and Serie C2 clubs from Chievo since 2004. During on loan at Gualdo, Sambenedettese and Massese, the clubs also holds half of ownership.

In summer 2008, he joined Modena on loan, from Chievo. In summer 2009 Modena acquired half of the registration rights for €230,000. In June 2011 Chievo gave up the remain rights for free and signed keeper Marco Silvestri.

References

External links

 https://web.archive.org/web/20081030101234/http://www.modenafc.net/squadra/diagouraga.asp

1984 births
Living people
French footballers
People from Corbeil-Essonnes
French sportspeople of Malian descent
Citizens of Mali through descent
Malian footballers
Mali under-20 international footballers
Malian expatriate footballers
Bologna F.C. 1909 players
A.C. ChievoVerona players
S.P.A.L. players
A.S. Sambenedettese players
U.S. Massese 1919 players
Modena F.C. players
Serie B players
Expatriate footballers in Italy
Association football defenders
Footballers from Essonne